Major General Arthur Charles Shortt,  (2 April 1899 – June 1984) was a British Army officer who served as Director of Military Intelligence from 1949 to 1953.

Military career
Shortt was commissioned into the Royal Engineers on 26 August 1916, during the First World War. He served during the interwar period, where he was in charge of a company of Gentlemen Cadets at the Royal Military Academy, Woolwich from January 1931.

Shortt served in the Second World War as Director of Technical Training at the War Office from May 1943, before seeing action in North-West Europe in 1944. He was appointed an Officer of the Order of the British Empire in June 1945.

Shortt became Director of Military Intelligence in December 1949, in which role he regarded the British Army of the Rhine Intelligence Service "as the most important Field Agency on the Soviet Army anywhere". He was appointed a Companion of the Order of the Bath in the 1951 New Year Honours, and went on to be Head of the Joint Services Liaison Staff in Australia in September 1953 before retiring in April 1956.

References

External links
Generals of World War II

1899 births
1984 deaths
British Army generals
Academics of the Royal Military Academy, Woolwich
Companions of the Order of the Bath
Officers of the Order of the British Empire
Royal Engineers officers
Military personnel from Somerset
British Army personnel of World War I
British Army brigadiers of World War II